Theatre of Blood (known in the U.S. as Theater of Blood) is a 1973 British horror comedy film directed by Douglas Hickox, and starring Vincent Price as vengeful actor Edward Lionheart and Diana Rigg as his daughter Edwina. The cast also includes Harry Andrews, Coral Browne, Robert Coote, Diana Dors, Jack Hawkins,  Ian Hendry, Joan Hickson,  Michael Hordern, Arthur Lowe, Robert Morley, Milo O'Shea, Dennis Price and Eric Sykes.

Plot
After being humiliated by members of the Theatre Critics Guild at an awards ceremony, Shakespearean actor Edward Kendal Sheridan Lionheart is seen committing suicide by diving into the Thames from a great height. He survives and is rescued by a group of vagrants. Two years later, beginning on the Ides of March, Lionheart sets out to exact vengeance against the critics who failed to acclaim his genius, killing them one by one in ways very similar to murder scenes in the season of William Shakespeare's plays that he last performed. Before each murder, Lionheart recites the critic's damning review of his performance in the role.

The first critic, George Maxwell, is repeatedly stabbed by a mob of murderous homeless people, suggested by the murder of Caesar in Julius Caesar. The second, Hector Snipe, is impaled with a spear, and his body is dragged away to appear at Maxwell's funeral tied to a horse's tail, replicating the murder of Hector in Troilus and Cressida. The third, Horace Sprout, is decapitated while sleeping, as is Cloton in Cymbeline. The fourth critic, Trevor Dickman, has his heart cut out by Shylock in The Merchant of Venice, the play being rewritten so that Antonio is forced to repay his debt with a pound of flesh. The fifth, Oliver Larding, is drowned in a barrel of wine, as is the Duke of Clarence in Richard III.

For the next play, Romeo and Juliet, Lionheart lures the critic Peregrine Devlin to a fencing gymnasium, where he reenacts the sword fight from the play. He badly wounds Devlin but chooses not to kill him at this juncture. The sixth critic, Solomon Psaltery, an obsessively jealous man, murders his wife, believing her to be unfaithful, as portrayed in Othello. Although Psaltery survives, his actions lead to his imprisonment, and he will likely die in prison. The seventh critic, Miss Chloe Moon, is electrocuted to replicate the burning of Joan of Arc in Henry VI, Part 1. The eighth critic, flamboyant gourmand Meredith Merridew, is force-fed pies made from the flesh of his two toy poodles until he chokes to death, replicating the demise of Queen Tamora in Titus Andronicus.

It is revealed early in the film that Lionheart is being aided by his adoring daughter Edwina. Eventually, she is arrested as the prime suspect in the murders, forcing Lionheart to reveal himself to Devlin. Lionheart tells Devlin to give him the award or be killed. Devlin refuses, and Lionheart plans to put out his eyes with red-hot daggers, as happens to Gloucester in King Lear. However, his contraption gets stuck just as the police arrive to save Devlin. Lionheart sets fire to the theatre. In the confusion, one of the vagrants kills Edwina by striking her on the head with the award statuette, unwittingly casting her in the role of Cordelia, Lear's youngest daughter. Lionheart retreats, carrying her body to the roof and delivering Lear's final monologue before the roof caves in, sending him to his death. Devlin, a critic even in the face of death, then gives Lionheart's performance a positive if mixed review.

Cast

 Vincent Price ... Edward Lionheart
 Diana Rigg ... Edwina Lionheart
 Ian Hendry ... Peregrine Devlin
 Harry Andrews ... Trevor Dickman
 Robert Coote ... Oliver Larding
 Michael Hordern ... George Maxwell
 Robert Morley ... Meredith Merridew
 Coral Browne ... Chloe Moon
 Jack Hawkins ... Solomon Psaltery
 Arthur Lowe ... Horace Sprout
 Dennis Price ... Hector Snipe
 Milo O'Shea ... Inspector Boot
 Eric Sykes ... Sgt. Dogge
 Diana Dors ... Maisie Psaltery
 Joan Hickson ... Mrs. Sprout
 Renée Asherson ... Mrs. Maxwell
 Madeline Smith ... Rosemary
 Brigid Erin Bates ... Agnes
 Charles Sinnickson ... Vicar
 Tutte Lemkow ... Meths Drinker
 Declan Mulholland ... Meths Drinker
 Stanley Bates ... Meths Drinker
 John Gilpin ... Meths Drinker

Like other movies in the last years of his life, Hawkins was dubbed by his friend Charles Gray. Both Hawkins and Dennis Price died within a few months of the film's release.

Production
The film was originally to be titled Much Ado About Murder.    
Robert Fuest, director of The Abominable Dr. Phibes, was originally offered this film to direct, but turned it down on the grounds of not wishing to be typed as "the guy who makes Vincent Price theme killing movies."

Director Douglas Hickox was quite enamored of the cast he'd assembled portraying the doomed critics, saying: "The cast was so good that all I had to do as director was open the dressing room door and let the cameras roll."

Theatre of Blood was filmed entirely on location. Lionheart's hideout, the "Burbage Theatre", was the Putney Hippodrome, which was built in 1906, but had been vacant and dilapidated for more than ten years before it was used in the film. (It was also used in Hickox's previous film, Sitting Target (1972). It was demolished in 1975 to make way for housing units.)

Lionheart's tomb is a Sievier family monument in Kensal Green Cemetery, showing a seated man, one hand placed on the head of a woman kneeling in adoration, while the other holds the Bible, its pages opened to a passage from the Gospel of Luke. The monument was altered for the film by substituting plaster masks of Price and Rigg for the real faces, replacing the Bible with a volume of Shakespeare, and adding Lionheart's name and dates.

Peregrine Devlin's Thames-side apartment is the penthouse flat at Alembic House (now known as Peninsula Heights) on the Albert Embankment. At the time of filming, the property belonged to the actor and film producer Stanley Baker. It is now the London home of novelist and disgraced politician Jeffrey Archer.

When pre-production commenced, Coral Browne insisted that she would wear only clothing designed by Jean Muir. The film's costume designer, Michael Baldwin, informed Browne that the budget could not possibly stretch to designer clothing for any of the cast. Baldwin was surprised and angered to get a call from Douglas Hickox after he had had a meeting with Browne, telling him that she could have the dresses she requested, increasing the budget solely to accommodate her demands. Baldwin was further infuriated to discover that Browne kept all the dresses after filming wrapped.

"Young Man Among Roses", the miniature featured in the introduction and used as the model for the Critics' Award Statuette, is by the Elizabethan portraitist Nicolas Hilliard.

Critical reception
This film was reportedly a favourite of Vincent Price's, as he had always wanted the chance to act in Shakespeare. Before or after each death in the film. Lionheart recites passages of Shakespeare, giving Price an outlet to deliver such speeches as Hamlet's third soliloquy ("To be, or not to be, that is the question..."); Mark Antony's eulogy for Caesar from Julius Caesar ("Friends, Romans, countrymen, lend me your ears...");  "Now is the winter of our discontent..." from the beginning of Richard III; and the raving of King Lear after the death of his faithful daughter. Diana Rigg regarded Theatre of Blood as her best film.

The film is sometimes considered to be a spoof or homage of The Abominable Dr. Phibes. Similarities with the earlier film include a protagonist (Vincent Price) who is presumed dead and is seeking revenge; nine intended victims, one of whom works directly with Scotland Yard and survives; themed murders rooted in literature; and a young female sidekick.

Theatre of Blood maintains an 88% "fresh" approval rating on Rotten Tomatoes from 40 reviews with the consensus "Deliciously campy and wonderfully funny, Theater of Blood features Vincent Price at his melodramatic best." The Los Angeles Times called it "quite possibly the best horror film Vincent Price has ever made. Certainly it affords him the best role he has ever had in the genre. A triumph of witty, stylish Grand Guignol, it allows Price to range richly between humour and pathos."

Stage adaptation
The film was adapted for the stage by the British company Improbable, with Jim Broadbent playing Edward Lionheart and Rachael Stirling (Diana Rigg's daughter), playing Lionheart's daughter. The play differs from the film in that the critics are from British newspapers, including The Guardian and The Times, and the only set is an abandoned theatre. The play is again set in the 1970s, rather than being updated. Most of the secondary characters were excised, including police, and the number of deaths reduced. The killings based on Othello and Cymbeline are omitted as they would have to take place outside the theatre and rely on secondary characters, such as the critics' wives. The name of Lionheart's daughter is changed from "Edwina" to "Miranda" to enhance the Shakespearean influence. The adaptation ran in London at the National Theatre between May and September 2005 and received mixed reviews.

Vincent Price and Coral Browne
Diana Rigg introduced Vincent Price to his future wife Coral Browne during the making of the film. Browne recalled in a television documentary Caviar to the General in 1990 that she had not wanted to make "one of those scary Vincent Price movies", but she was persuaded to take the part of Chloe Moon by her friends Robert Morley and Michael Hordern, acknowledging that the film thus had a very strong cast. Rigg was unaware that Price was married.

References

External links

 
 
 
 Theatre of Blood at Letterbox DVD
 2005 National Theatre Production
 Putney Hippodrome at Cinema Treasures
 Photo of Putney Hippodrome

1973 films
1973 horror films
1970s comedy horror films
1970s serial killer films
British comedy horror films
British black comedy films
British serial killer films
Films directed by Douglas Hickox
Films based on works by William Shakespeare
Films shot in London
Films about actors
British films about revenge
United Artists films
Films adapted into plays
1973 comedy films
Films with screenplays by Stanley Mann
Films produced by Stanley Mann
British exploitation films
1970s English-language films
1970s British films